Rosa webbiana, occasionally called Webb's rose, wild rose, or thorny rose, is a widely distributed species of flowering plant in the family Rosaceae. It is native to Central Asia, Tibet and Xinjiang in China, Afghanistan, Pakistan, the western Himalayas, and Nepal. It grows in scrub, grassy places, valleys, and slopes. A diploid, its  chromosome count is 2n = 2x = 14.

References

webbiana
Flora of Central Asia
Flora of Afghanistan
Flora of Nepal
Flora of Pakistan
Flora of Tibet
Flora of Xinjiang
Flora of West Himalaya
Plants described in 1835